The 2022–23 Croatian Women's First Football League (Prva hrvatska nogometna liga za žene) is 32nd season of Croatian Women's First Football League, the national championship for women's association football teams in Croatia, since its establishment in 1992. The season started on 11 September 2022.

The league is contested by eight teams. First stage will be played in a double round robin format, with each team playing every other team two times over 14 rounds. In a second stage teams will be divided in two groups according to the table standings. ŽNK Split are the defending champions, having won their 3rd title in 2021–22.

Teams

The following is a complete list of teams who have secured a place in the 2022–23 Croatian Women's First Football League.

Regular season

League table

Results

Top scorers
Updated to matches played on 12 March 2023.

References

External links
Croatian Women's First Football League at UEFA.com
Croatian Women's First Football League at Croatian Football Federation website

Croatian Women's First Football League seasons
Croatia
women
Football
Football